The Junior League World Series Asia–Pacific Region (formally the Far East Region) is one of six International regions that currently sends teams to the World Series in Taylor, Michigan. The region's participation in the JLWS dates back to 1999.

Asia–Pacific Region Countries

Region Champions
As of the 2022 Junior League World Series.

Results by Country
As of the 2022 Junior League World Series.

See also
Asia–Pacific Region in other Little League divisions
Little League — Far East
Asia-Pacific & Middle East
Japan
Intermediate League
Senior League
Big League

References

Asia-Pacific